Red as Blood, or Tales from the Sisters Grimmer is a short story collection of dark fantasy retellings of popular fairytales by British author Tanith Lee. Contrary to what the title may suggest, it not only includes retellings of fairytales by the Brothers Grimm, but also by Charles Perrault, Gabrielle-Suzanne Barbot de Villeneuve or Alexander Afanasyev. The title story was nominated for a Nebula Award.

Contents

Red as Blood, or Tales from the Sisters Grimmer contains the following tales:

 "Paid Piper" – Asia: 1st century BC (retelling of "Pied Piper of Hamelin")
 "Red as Blood" – Europe: 14th century (retelling of "Snow White")
 "Thorns" – Eurasia: 15th century (retelling of Sleeping Beauty)
 "When The Clock Strikes" – Europe: 16th century (retelling of "Cinderella")
 "The Golden Rope" – Europe: 17th century (retelling of Rapunzel)
 "The Princess And Her Future" – Asia: 18th century (retelling of "The Frog Prince")
 "Wolfland" – Scandinavia: 19th century (retelling of "Little Red Riding Hood")
 "Black As Ink" – Scandinavia: 20th century (retelling of Swan Lake)
 "Beauty" – Earth: The future (retelling of Beauty and the Beast)

In 2014, the book was released as an expanded edition including a new story, "The Waters of Sorrow", which had been previously published in 2011 in Weird Tales.

Reception
Dave Langford reviewed Red as Blood for White Dwarf No. 48, and stated that "Fun: but these inversions can become repetitious, while Lee's SF 'Beauty and the Beast' founders in a morass of soggy pseudoscience."

Reviews
Review by Faren Miller (1983) in Locus, #264 January 1983
Review by Frank Catalano (1983) in Amazing Science Fiction, July 1983
Review by Baird Searles (1983) in Isaac Asimov's Science Fiction Magazine, August 1983
Review by Joe Sanders (1983) in Starship, Winter 1983-84
Review by Vincent Omniaveritas (1983) in Cheap Truth #1
Review by Bruce Sterling (1983) in Cheap Truth #1

References

Nickerson, Susan L. "Red as Blood (Book)." Library Journal 108.2 (Jan 15, 1983): 147.

1983 short story collections
Books with cover art by Michael Whelan
DAW Books books
Fantasy short story collections
Literature based on fairy tales
Short story collections by Tanith Lee
Horror short story collections